The Roman Catholic Diocese of São Miguel Paulista is a diocese located in the district of São Miguel Paulista, in the city and Ecclesiastical province of São Paulo in Brazil.

History
 15 March 1989: Established as Diocese of São Miguel Paulista from the Metropolitan Archdiocese of São Paulo

Bishops
 Bishops of São Miguel Paulista (Roman rite)
 Bishop Fernando Legal, S.D.B. (1989.03.15 – 2008.01.09)
 Bishop Manuel Parrado Carral (2008.01.09 – 2022.09.21)
 Bishop Algacir Munhak, C.S. (2022.09.21 – present)

Other priest of this diocese who became bishop
José María Libório Camino Saracho, appointed Bishop of Presidente Prudente, São Paulo in 2002

References
 GCatholic.org
 Catholic Hierarchy
 Diocese website (Portuguese)

Roman Catholic dioceses in Brazil
Christian organizations established in 1989
São Miguel Paulista, Roman Catholic Diocese of
Roman Catholic dioceses and prelatures established in the 20th century